Syed Hasan Azhar Rizvi (born 02 Feb 1962) is a Pakistani jurist currently serving in Supreme Court of Pakistan as s judge since 11 November 2022 and also has been Justice of the Sindh High Court (SHC) since 18 Feb 2010 to 10 November 2022. He was ranked on 4th in seniority list of Sindh High Court.

Elevation to Supreme Court of Pakistan 
The elevation of Hasan Azhar Rizvi from the Sindh High Court (SLHC), to the Supreme Court was approved by the Judicial Commission of Pakistan (JCP) on 24 October 2022.

References

1962 births
Living people
Judges of the Sindh High Court
Pakistani judges
Justices of the Supreme Court of Pakistan